Liam Vaughan Henry Fontaine (born 7 January 1986) is an English footballer who plays as a defender for Scottish League One side Edinburgh. He has previously played in the English leagues for Fulham, Yeovil Town and Bristol City, and in the Scottish leagues for Kilmarnock, Hibernian, Ross County and Dundee.

Career

Fulham
Fontaine, who was a youth player at Fulham, represented England at under-16 and under-17 level. Fontaine spent some time at Yeovil Town in the first part of the 2004–05 season. His loan move was initially for a single month, but was later extended by a further two months. He made a couple of first team appearances for Fulham in January 2005. His debut came in a Premier League game against Southampton at St. Mary's on 5 January, which was drawn 3–3. He enjoyed a further loan spell in the latter part of the 2004–05 season with Kilmarnock in the Scottish Premier League.

Bristol City
After being brought to Yeovil by then manager Gary Johnson, Fontaine then went back to Fulham until he was brought to Bristol City on loan by his former Yeovil manager Johnson. The loan spell was made permanent at the end of that season with Fontaine signing a two-year contract, with City having to pay Fulham an undisclosed fee through tribunal. A key member of the 2006–07 promotion team and flourished once more at Championship level, he became centre stage when his goal against Wolves in November left his manager Gary Johnson red-faced – having previously told his defender he would "bare my backside in Burton's window" if he found the net. Fontaine signed a new deal with Bristol City on 12 January 2012 to keep him at the club until the end of 2014 season, stating his ambition is to be the club's captain on a permanent basis.

On 2 September 2013, Fontaine joined Championship side Yeovil Town, for a third spell, on loan until January 2014. At the end of the 2013–14 season, Fontaine was released by Bristol City.

Hibernian
On 26 August 2014, Fontaine joined Scottish Championship side Hibernian. He made his debut the same day, in Hibernian's 3–2 victory against Dumbarton in the Scottish League Cup. Fontaine made 38 appearances and scored two goals in the 2014–15 season. In June 2015, he signed a two-year contract with Hibernian. He scored a goal in the March 2016 Scottish League Cup Final, which Hibs lost 2–1 to Ross County. Fontaine played the first 70 minutes of the 2016 Scottish Cup Final, which Hibs won 3–2 against Rangers.

In June 2017, Fontaine signed a contract with Hibs for the 2017–18 season. He suffered an ankle injury playing for the Hibs under-20 side in September 2017, which head coach Neil Lennon said would prevent Fontaine from playing for at least 10 weeks.

Ross County
On 31 January 2018, Fontaine joined Scottish Premiership team Ross County on a free transfer. He made his debut later that day, in a 4–2 defeat against Aberdeen. County were relegated from the Premiership at the end of the 2017–18 season, but Fontaine helped them win promotion from the Scottish Championship in 2018–19. He left County by mutual consent in October 2020.

Dundee 
On 20 November 2020 after a trial period, Fontaine joined Scottish Championship side Dundee until the end of the season. He would make his debut the next day as a substitute against Ayr United. Fontaine had a prolific December, scoring 3 goals in 4 games for the club going into the new year. Fontaine would be a key piece in the Dundee side leading up to and in the Premiership play-offs, and helped the club to gain promotion to the Premiership. On 28 May 2021, Fontaine signed a one-year extension with Dundee. Fontaine would leave Dundee following the end of his contract in May 2022.

Edinburgh
Fontaine signed for Scottish League One club Edinburgh in July 2022.

Personal life
During a period out of football due to injury, Fontaine began playing the guitar. In September 2018 he released a single called "Life Lessons".

Career statistics

Honours

Player
Hibernian
Scottish Cup: 2015–16
Scottish Championship: 2016–17

Ross County
Scottish Championship: 2018–19
Scottish Challenge Cup: 2018–19

Notes

References

External links
International profile at theFA

1986 births
Living people
Footballers from Beckenham
English people of Dominica descent
Black British sportsmen
Association football defenders
English footballers
Fulham F.C. players
Yeovil Town F.C. players
Kilmarnock F.C. players
Bristol City F.C. players
Premier League players
English Football League players
Scottish Premier League players
Hibernian F.C. players
Scottish Professional Football League players
England youth international footballers
Ross County F.C. players
Dundee F.C. players
F.C. Edinburgh players